Staraya Guta is a rural locality (a selo) and the administrative center of Starogutnyanskoye Rural Settlement, Unechsky District, Bryansk Oblast, Russia. The population was 761 as of 2010. There are 18 streets.

Geography 
Staraya Guta is located 13 km southwest of Unecha (the district's administrative centre) by road. Robchik is the nearest rural locality.

References 

Rural localities in Unechsky District